Harry Miller (born 11 June 1985) in Port Lincoln, South Australia was an Australian rules footballer who played in the Australian Football League.

Selected at pick 25 in the 2003 AFL draft, Miller was a small forward who played 14 games with Hawthorn in the 2005 season, and another four in 2006. He kicked four goals in the narrow loss to Richmond near the end of the 2005 season and earlier that year had his statistically most productive match with 19 disposals in Hawthorn's comprehensive win over Brisbane.

Miller was delisted at the end of the 2006 season and returned to the South Australian Football League to play with the Port Adelaide Magpies.

He is the cousin of the Burgoyne brothers Peter and Shaun, and also Daniel Wells.

References

External links
 
 

Hawthorn Football Club players
1985 births
Living people
Port Adelaide Magpies players
Indigenous Australian players of Australian rules football
Australian rules footballers from South Australia